The Magic Chord is a chord and installation (1984) created by La Monte Young, consisting of the pitches E, F, A, B, D, E, G, and A, in ascending order and used in works including his The Well-Tuned Piano and Chronos Kristalla (1990). The latter was performed by the Kronos Quartet and features all notes of the magic chord as harmonics on open strings. The quartet has been described as, "offer[ing] perhaps the ultimate challenge in performing in a just environment".

Described as, "complex and throbbing", the chord does not contain its fundamental (see root chords), E, and is a subset of the Romantic Chord, G-Dorian in eight octaves, spelled G, A, B, C, D, E, F, G. "When the Magic Opening Chord is obtained by playing the Opening Chord at one end of a room while the Magic Chord is played at the other (as Young set it up for me), the feeling-changes of the stereo effect as you move back and forth[-]are dazzling." The opening chord consists of E, B, C, E, F, B (ratios 4:6:7:8:9:12 ), adding C and E to the magic chord when combined as the magic opening chord.

The Well-Tuned Piano is based on a pitch lattice of perfect fifths and harmonic sevenths, tuned as follows:

For example, G (21/16) is the harmonic seventh of the perfect fifth (7/4 * 3/2 = 21/16):

References

Sources
 
  
 

7-limit tuning and intervals
Chords
Installation art
Minimalistic compositions